Donald H. "Don" Turner Jr. (born July 19, 1964) is an American Republican politician who served in the Vermont House of Representatives, to which he was first elected in 2006. He represented the Chittenden-9 district until 2012 and represented the Chittenden-10 district from 2013 to 2019 for the town of Milton in Chittenden County. He also served as the Minority Leader of the Vermont House of Representatives from 2011 to 2019. Turner currently serves as the Town Manager of Milton as well as a member of the Board of Civil Authority. He is also a certified fire instructor, a member of the International Association of Fire Chiefs, Milton Firefighters Association, and was the Milton Fire and Rescue Chief and Forest Fire Warden.

Turner was the 2018 Republican nominee for Lieutenant Governor of Vermont. He ran on a platform of affordability and economic growth; balance and collaboration; and supporting first responders and service-members. Turner lost to incumbent Dave Zuckerman (P/D) in the November general election.

Legislative service 
Turner was first elected to the Legislature in 2006. During his time in the Vermont House Representatives, Turner served on several committees, including the House Committee on Commerce and Economic Development; the House Committee on Education; the House Committee on Agriculture and Forest Products; the House Committee on Corrections and Institutions; the House Rules Committee; the Joint Rules Committee; and the Legislative Council Committee.

Much of the legislation introduced by Turner focused on property tax relief, affordability, economic growth, housing development, government modernization, budgetary management, public safety, and permitting reform. This includes legislation to improve the operations of state government, reduce property tax bills, eliminate taxes on Social Security income and military retirement income, and address unfunded pension liabilities. While serving as Minority Leader, Turner also worked with Democratic Representatives to advance legislation on issues like sexual harassment prevention.

Electoral history 
2018 Vermont Lieutenant Governor General Election

2016 Chittenden-10 State Representative General Election

2014 Chittenden-10 State Representative General Election

2012 Chittenden-10 State Representative General Election

2010 Chittenden-9 State Representative General Election

2008 Chittenden-9 State Representative General Election

2006 Chittenden-9 State Representative General Election

References

1964 births
21st-century American politicians
Champlain College alumni
Living people
Republican Party members of the Vermont House of Representatives
People from Milton, Vermont